The 1963–64 Ranji Trophy was the 30th season of the Ranji Trophy. Bombay won the title defeating Rajasthan in the final. This was the fourth consecutive final between the two teams, all of which were won by Bombay

Highlights
 On a rain affected wicket in Bangalore against Mysore, Kerala got all out for 27 in two hours. Kerala lost the first four wickets for zero runs and first nine for 12. TK Madhavan batting at No.11 top scored with 11 and the last wicket more than doubled the score.
 Delhi and Jammu Kashmir played the second shortest match in Ranji trophy. Jammu & Kashmir finished the first day on 37 for 9 in the second innings, and were all out for 38 early on the second day to lose by an innings. 
 Jammu and Kashmir failed to reach 100 in the eight innings in their last four matches. 
 Joginder Rao of Services took a hat-trick on his debut against Jammu and Kashmir.
 In his second match, against Northern Punjab, Rao took two hat-tricks in the same innings. Three hat-tricks in two matches is a unique feat. Albert Trott is the only other bowler to take two hat-tricks in the same innings.

Group stage

South Zone

North Zone

East Zone

West Zone

Central Zone

Knockout stage

Final

Scorecards and averages
Cricinfo
Cricketarchive

References

External links

1964 in Indian cricket
Ranji Trophy seasons
Domestic cricket competitions in 1963–64